Alvaro Vitali (born 3 February 1950) is an Italian actor.

He was an electrician until he was discovered by Federico Fellini and played a small part in Satyricon (1969), it led to other roles, notably in the movie Amarcord (1973).

In the 1970s, Vitali became one of the most charismatic actors in the commedia erotica all'italiana (erotic comedy) genre. He was very popular in Spain as well. He recently worked for the satirical TV show Striscia la notizia in a parody of Ferrari manager Jean Todt.

Selected filmography

Satyricon (1969) .... Blue-Faced 'Emperor' on Stage (uncredited)
I clowns (1970, TV Movie) .... Himself
Roma (1972) .... Alvaro - Tap Dancer at Teatrino (uncredited)
Meo Patacca (1972) .... Bit Part (uncredited)
What? (1972) .... Cross-Eyed Painter
Partirono preti, tornarono... curati (1973)
Dirty Weekend (1973) .... Member of Camera Team (uncredited)
Even Angels Eat Beans (1973) .... Tailor Assistant (uncredited)
La Tosca (1973) .... Un derelitto
Polvere di stelle (1973) .... (uncredited)
Amarcord (1973) .... Naso
Rugantino (1973) .... Beggar (uncredited)
L'arbitro (1974) .... Il postino (uncredited)
4 marmittoni alle grandi manovre (1974) .... Soldato Viola (uncredited)
Il colonnello Buttiglione diventa generale (1974) .... Infermiere (uncredited)
Romanzo popolare (1974) .... Paolo, conoscente di Giulio e Vincenzina
La poliziotta (1974) .... Fantuzzi
Profumo di donna (1974) .... Vittorio
La pupa del gangster (1975) .... Taxi Driver
L'insegnante (1975) .... Tatuzzo
Vergine, e di nome Maria (1975) .... Rocco
Due cuori, una cappella (1975) .... Tassista strabico
La liceale (1975) .... Petruccio Sciacca
Frankenstein all'italiana (1975)
Il tempo degli assassini (1975)
La dottoressa sotto il lenzuolo (1976) .... Alvaro
Telefoni bianchi (1976) .... The Son in the Brothel (uncredited)
La poliziotta fa carriera (1976) .... Tarallo
Uomini si nasce poliziotti si muore (1976) .... Concierge at Pasquini's building
La professoressa di scienze naturali (1976) .... Peppino Cariglia
Classe mista (1976) .... Angelino Zampanò
La segretaria privata di mio padre (1976) .... Oscar
Spogliamoci così, senza pudor... (1976) .... Broccolini, Aka Xx2 (Segment "Il Detective")
La dottoressa del distretto militare (1976) .... Alvaro Pappalardo
La vergine, il toro e il capricorno (1977) .... Alvaro
Taxi Girl (1977) .... Alvaro
Per amore di Poppea (1977, directed by Mariano Laurenti) .... Caio
La compagna di banco (1977) .... Salvatore
La soldatessa alla visita militare (1977) .... Alvaro Quattromani
L'insegnante va in collegio (1978) .... Armandino Fusecchia
La liceale nella classe dei ripetenti (1978) .... Professor Modesti
L'insegnante viene a casa (1978) .... Ottavio - Amedeo's son
La soldatessa alle grandi manovre (1978) .... Alvaro
Scherzi da prete (1978) .... Alvaro (uncredited)
L'infermiera di notte (1979) .... Peppino
L'insegnante balla... con tutta la classe (1979) .... Anacleto Petruccio
Dove vai se il vizietto non ce l'hai? (1979) .... Aroldo / Carlotta Angulo / Gigetto
La liceale seduce i professori (1979) .... Salvatore Pinzarrone
La poliziotta della squadra del buon costume (1979) .... Appuntato Tarallo
L'infermiera nella corsia dei militari (1979) .... Peppino
Cocco mio (Gros câlin, 1979) .... Brancardier
La liceale, il diavolo e l'acquasanta (1979) .... Carmelo Petralia
L'insegnante al mare con tutta la classe (1980) .... Cocò
La ripetente fa l'occhietto al preside (1980) .... Beccafico
La liceale al mare con l'amica di papà (also known as La liceale al mare con tutta la classe, 1980) .... Terenzio
La dottoressa ci sta col colonnello (1980) .... Arturo Mazzancolla
L'onorevole con l'amante sotto il letto (1981) .... Teo Mezzabotta
Pierino contro tutti (1981) .... Pierino
La poliziotta a New York (1981) .... Alvaro Tarallo / Joe Dodiciomicidi
Pierino medico della Saub (1981) .... Alvaro Gasperoni / Pippetto
La dottoressa preferisce i marinai (1981) .... Alvaro
Pierino colpisce ancora (1982) .... Pierino
Giggi il bullo (1982) .... Giggi il bullo
Gianburrasca (1982) .... Giannino Stoppani / Gian Burrasca
Paulo Roberto Cotechiño centravanti di sfondamento (1983) .... Paulo Roberto Cotechiño / Idraulico
Il tifoso, l'arbitro e il calciatore (1984) .... Alvaro Presutti
Zanzibar (1986, Episode: "La vedova) .... LinoMortacci (1989) .... TorquatoPierino torna a scuola (1990) .... PierinoClub Vacanze (1995) .... Alvaro / PierinoSe lo fai sono guai (2001)Ladri di barzelette (2004)Impotenti esistenziali (2009)Vacanze a gallipoli (2011)E' il cancro il mio amante (2012)Tutti a Ostia Beach - Il film (2013)Effetti indesiderati (2015)Supposte (2016)Mò vi mento - Lira di Achille (2018)Buon lavoro (2018)Vivi la vita (2019)GG Turbo'' (2020)

References

External links
 
http://www.cinematrash.com - Alvaro Vitali - Italian Trash Cinema.

1950 births
Italian male film actors
Living people
Male actors from Rome